Benkerjoch Pass (el. 674 m) is a mountain pass in the canton of Aargau in Switzerland.

It connects Küttigen and Oberhof. Until 1801, the pass was the boundary between Austria and Switzerland. The current pass road was built in 1977.

A postal bus route runs over the pass to Aarau.

Mountain passes of Aargau
Mountain passes of Switzerland